Kiriakidis or Kyriakidis is a patronymic surname which literally means "the son/daughter of Kiriakos (Kyriakos)". It may refer to:

Dimitris Kyriakidis (born 1986), Greek footballer playing for Panserraikos F.C.
Ilias Kyriakidis (born 1985), Greek footballer playing for Ergotelis F.C.
Kosmas Kiriakidis, former president of the Greek football club AEK Athens F.C.
Pavlos Kyriakidis (born 1991), Greek footballer playing for Atromitos F.C. 
Pétros Kiriakídis, Greek sprinter, who specializes in the 400 metres
Stefanos Kiriakidis, Greek film, stage and television actor
Yannis Kyriakides, Cypriot composer residing in the Netherlands

Greek-language surnames
Surnames
Patronymic surnames